Niilo Sevänen (born 19 August 1979) is a musician from Joensuu, Finland.  He is best known as the current lead vocalist/bassist for the melodic death metal band, Insomnium.

Background 
Sevänen grew up on the coast of Finland in the town of Turku, before moving to Joensuu where he was raised. In 1994, he began learning the bass guitar and formed his first band: a punk rock act called Paise. The following year, the band changed its name to Stonecrow and began to shift its musical style. Sevänen left the band two years later due to musical differences. However, following his departure, he quickly collaborated with musicians whose interests aligned themselves with Sevänen and formed the melodic death metal band Insomnium.

Musical influences 
Sevänen grew up listening to a variety of hard rock, glam metal, grunge and heavy metal bands, among them Queen, Aerosmith, Sepultura and Metallica.

Outside Insomnium 

Sevänen is, outside Insomnium, the director of culture in Kotka, Finland. He organises, amongst others, the Kotka Maritime Festival. He also majored in history of culture and literature. It is speculated that he did the vocals for Belzebubs' album "Pantheon Of The Nightside Gods". Fictional black metal band from JP Ahonen's comics "Belzebubs". This is yet to be confirmed by the author as he is in talks for "live" shows of the band, similar to the ones of Gorillaz and Dethklok.

References 

1979 births
21st-century Finnish male singers
21st-century bass guitarists
Death metal musicians
Finnish heavy metal bass guitarists
Finnish heavy metal singers
Living people
Musicians from Turku
Insomnium members